Heer Syal is a pre-partition Punjabi film released in 1938. It is the second film directed by Kishan Dev Mehra, along with assistant director M. M. Billoo Mehra. It starred new actors Balo and M. Ismail, with Noor Jehan, Haider Bandi and Eiden Bai. It is based on Heer Ranjha - a tragic epic romance story from Punjab by Waris Shah.

Cast
  Balo
 Shamshad Begum
  M. Ismail
  Baby Noor Jehan
  Eiden Bai
  P. N. Bally
  J. N. Dar Kashmiri
  A. Rahman Kashmiri
  R. P. Kapoor
  Haider Bandi

Crew
  Directed: Kishan Dev Mehra
  Assistant director: Madan Mohan Mehra
  Produced: Indra Movitone
  Written: F. D. Sharf
  Screenplay: F. D. Sharf
  Story: F. D. Sharaff
  Based on: Heer By Waris Shah
  Music: Dhoomi Khan
  Lyrics: F. D. Sharf

Songs

See also 
Heer Sial (1965 film)
Heer Ranjha (1932 film)
Heer (1955 film)
Heer Ranjha (1970 film)- a Punjabi film from Pakistan
Heer Raanjha- a 1970 Hindi film from India 
Heer (disambiguation)

References

External link

1938 films
Indian black-and-white films
Punjabi-language Indian films
Punjabi-language Pakistani films
1930s Punjabi-language films
Heer Ranjha
Films based on Indian folklore
Films based on poems